The 2016–17 West Virginia Mountaineers men's basketball team represented West Virginia University during the 2016–17 NCAA Division I men's basketball season. The Mountaineers were coached by Bob Huggins, in his 10th season as WVU's head coach, and played their home games at WVU Coliseum in Morgantown, West Virginia as members of the Big 12 Conference. They finished the season 28–9, 12–6 in Big 12 play to finish in a three-way tie for second place. They defeated Texas and Kansas State in the Big 12 tournament before losing to Iowa State in the championship game. They received an at-large bid to the NCAA tournament where they defeated Bucknell and Notre Dame before losing in the Sweet Sixteen to Gonzaga.

Previous season
The Mountaineers finished the 2015–16 season 26–9, 13–5 in Big 12 play to finish in second place in conference. They defeated TCU and Oklahoma to advance to the championship game of the Big 12 tournament where they lost to Kansas. They received an at-large bid to the NCAA tournament where, as a No. 3 seed, they were upset in the First Round by No. 14 seed Stephen F. Austin.

Departures

Recruits

Roster

Schedule and results
Source: 

|-
!colspan=9 style=| Exhibition

|-
!colspan=9 style=| Regular season

|-
!colspan=9 style=| Big 12 Tournament

|-
!colspan=9 style=| NCAA tournament

Rankings

*AP does not release post-NCAA tournament rankings

See also
 2016–17 West Virginia Mountaineers women's basketball team

References

West Virginia
West Virginia Mountaineers men's basketball seasons
West Virginia Mountaineers men's bask
West Virginia Mountaineers men's bask
West Virginia